Dmitry Kabalevsky's Symphony No. 2 in C minor, Op. 19, written in 1934, is the second of the four symphonies he wrote and the most performed and recorded of the cycle, probably owing to its sense of drama, bright orchestration and expressive straightforwardness, ranging from melancholy to jubilance. With a dramatic and agitated yet extroverted, lyrical and fairly positive outlook, like other dramatic Russian symphonies from the Stalinist era it was alleged to deal with the struggle of mankind to reform society within Soviet values.

The symphony was premiered on December 25, 1934 in the Moscow Conservatory's Large Hall by the Moscow Philharmonic under Albert Coates. The international première was carried out (and recorded) in New York City on November 8, 1942 by the NBC Orchestra conducted by Arturo Toscanini, and it was well received, according to Olin Downes' review for the New York Times. Toscanini, who championed the overture from Kabalevsky's opera Colas Breugnon, would play it again in 1945.

Movements
 Allegro quasi presto
 Andante non troppo
 Prestissimo scherzando

Discography

References 

Compositions in C minor
Compositions by Dmitry Kabalevsky
Kabalevsky 2
1934 compositions